You'll Never Get Rich is a 1941 American musical comedy film with a wartime theme directed by Sidney Lanfield and starring Fred Astaire and Rita Hayworth, with music and lyrics by Cole Porter. The title stems from an old Army song which includes lyrics "You'll never get rich / By digging a ditch / You're in the Army now!"

This was Hayworth's first starring role in a big budgeted film from her home studio Columbia Pictures. While the film was in production, Life magazine put her on its cover, and featured inside a photo of Hayworth kneeling on a bed in a nightgown, which soon became one of the most widely distributed pin-ups of all time. Hayworth cooperated enthusiastically with Astaire's intense rehearsal habits, and was later to remark: "I guess the only jewels in my life are the pictures I made with Fred Astaire." The picture was very successful at the box office, turning Hayworth into a major star, and provided a welcome boost to Astaire, who felt his career had flagged since he had parted ways with Ginger Rogers.

One of the film's songs, "Since I Kissed My Baby Goodbye", was nominated for an Academy Award for Best Original Song.

Plot
Theater owner and womanizer Martin Cortland (Robert Benchley) asks for the help of his choreography manager Robert Curtis (Fred Astaire) to impress beautiful head-strong dancer Sheila (Rita Hayworth) in his classes. Robert is impressed by Sheila's attitude, which one of the dancers, Margo, finds remarkable as Robert is not usually impressed by his dancers so easily. Sheila goes on to visit Martin at his office, where he presents her with a diamond bracelet, which was originally for Martin's wife, for whom Martin bought a back-scratcher for instead. Sheila thanks Mr. Cortland, but leaves the bracelet in the bag. 
When Mrs. Cortland arrives, she finds the bracelet with a note for Sheila, and accuses her husband of cheating on her. Martin once again asks for Robert's help to pretend he and Sheila are dating and that the bracelet was a present from him to her.

Robert takes Sheila to a restaurant where the two dance together. While Robert is attracted by Sheila, Sheila believes that Robert is deeply in love with her and returns his affections. When the Cortlands arrive, Robert presents Sheila with the bracelet once again, for which she unexpectedly kisses him for it, shocking Martin and his wife. The next day, Robert finds out the newspapers are reporting on him and Sheila, accuses Martin of being behind this, and wants to join the army to get out of trouble.

At Sheila's home, Captain Tom Barton (John Hubbard), Sheila's potential boyfriend, invites Sheila and her Aunt Louise (Marjorie Gateson) to visit him and his mother (Ann Shoemaker) on his Army base. The same day when Cap. Tom arrives, Robert wants to talk to Sheila about the newspaper.  Sheila wants to get revenge on Robert for lying to her and makes a plan involving Tom and Aunt Louise. While Sheila is "talking" to Robert, Tom pretends to shoot Sheila, in which Robert takes the opportunity to leave. 
Robert gets into the army (after faking his weight) where he quickly befriends fellow draftees Swivel Tongue (Cliff Nazarro) and Kewpie Blain (Guinn "Big Boy" Williams), and clearly stands out from the rest of the army with his irreverent behaviour and tap-dancing.

Curtis finds himself imprisoned in the guardhouse after a series of confusions, but when he finds out that Sheila is around, pretends to be army captain and tricks Aunt Louise and begs Sheila to come visit him in the guardhouse, to which Sheila agrees.

Martin appears on the base to produce a show for the enlisted men and (at his request) is assigned Curtis as his assistant, who offers Martin the use of his apartment in town and insists that Sheila be included as his partner in the show. However, Martin is now in pursuit of another dancer, Sonya (Osa Massen), and has promised the lead to her.
Robert refuses to do the show with anyone else but Sheila and tells Martin to try the both out in a rehearsal. Martin agrees and Robert and Sheila dance (So Near, And Yet So Far) where Sheila understands that her feelings for Robert are not completely gone. 
After the rehearsal, Tom tells Sheila that he is being transferred to Panama and asks Sheila to marry him. Sheila says she will think about it, and tells Aunt Louise that she thinks Robert will propose to her that night and that she still loves him.

Robert invites Sheila to Martin's apartment, where he tells Sonya to hide so Sheila doesn't think Robert is cheating on her. Robert gives her a diamond gift, which is addressed to Sonya by Martin, angering both Sheila and Robert. 
Sheila refuses to perform with Robert, which causes the soldiers to come up with a We Want Sheila rebellion. Finally, Sheila agrees, so Robert puts his plan to work: in the show, the leads get married, so why not get a real priest and the two will be really married? And the plan is put to work. In the end of the show, a real priest marries them off, unknown to Sheila. 
After the show ends, Robert kisses Sheila and announces that the priest wasn't an actor, but a real priest, to the audiences shock.

Martin confesses his machinations to Sheila, who embraces him in relief and calls on her new husband in the guardhouse. The jilted Captain Barton generously arranges for Robert's release for his honeymoon; the film ends with Swiv and Blain's inept attempt to break into the guardhouse to free Robert, not aware that he is already on his way to the honeymoon with Sheila.

Cast

 Fred Astaire as Robert Curtis
 Rita Hayworth as Sheila Winthrop
 Robert Benchley as Martin Cortland
 John Hubbard as Captain Tom Barton
 Osa Massen as Sonya
 Frieda Inescort as Mrs. Julia Cortland
 Guinn Williams as Kewpie Blain
 Donald MacBride as Top Sergeant
 Cliff Nazarro as Swivel Tongue "Swiv"
 Marjorie Gateson as Aunt Louise
 Ann Shoemaker as Mrs. Barton
 Boyd Davis as Colonel Shiller
 Patti McCarty as young girl (uncredited)

Key songs and dance routines
Dance director was Robert Alton, Astaire's second-most-frequent choreographic collaborator after Hermes Pan. As Astaire generally choreographed his own and his partner's routines, Alton concentrated on the choruses. The choreography explores a diverse range of musical rhythms some of which are artfully juxtaposed in Cole Porter's score.

 "Rehearsal Duet": Short but virtuosic tap number with Astaire and Hayworth dancing side by side.
 "Boogie Barcarolle": Porter number which, not unlike Robert Russell Bennett's Waltz In Swing Time from Swing Time, overlays two very different musical rhythms. Astaire leads the chorus which includes Hayworth in an exhilarating and, for Astaire, unusual routine.
 "Shootin' the Works for Uncle Sam": Song and dance number where Astaire and chorus march through Grand Central Terminal. The choreography expresses the notion that Broadway-style dance rehearsals and army camp drills have much in common. The music and dance contrast march and jazz rhythms.
 "Since I Kissed My Baby Goodbye": Haunting and melancholy Porter standard introduced  by the Four Tones - an African-American quartet (lead singer Lucius "Dusty" Brooks, Leon Buck, Rudolph Hunter, and John Porter) - followed by a short Astaire solo, and all executed in the unrealistic - for its time - setting of an unsegregated guard house. Astaire also made a successful recording of this number with Decca in September 1941, backed in this instance by the Delta Rhythm Boys.
 "March Milastaire (A-Stairable Rag)": Another Porter number contrasting march and jazz rhythms, danced in a "tour de force" tap solo by Astaire, who expresses his sudden joy of being in love by using his taps to make as much noise as possible. This time, the purely instrumental African-American backing group comprised the twenty-year-old Chico Hamilton on drums, Buddy Collette (clarinet), Red Mack (trumpet), Alfred Grant (guitar) and Joe Comfort (jug).
 "So Near and Yet So Far": Porter's rumba melody is set to lyrics (sung by Astaire), which sum up the nature of Hayworth's irresistible allure. Astaire, clearly inspired by Hayworth's exceptional Latin dance pedigree, delivers his first on-screen synthesis of Latin-American and ballroom dance steps in a celebrated romantic partnering.
 "The Wedding Cake Walk": Liltin' Martha Tilton's rendition of this cheerful song is followed by a routine involving Astaire, Hayworth and a large chorus, the former pair ending up dancing on a wedding cake in the shape of a tank.

References

Bibliography

External links
 
 
 
 

1941 films
1941 musical comedy films
1941 romantic comedy films
1940s American films
1940s English-language films
1940s romantic musical films
American black-and-white films
American musical comedy films
American romantic comedy films
American romantic musical films
Columbia Pictures films
Films directed by Sidney Lanfield
Films produced by Samuel Bischoff
Films scored by Morris Stoloff
Films set in New York City
Military humor in film